Same-sex marriage has been legal in Tamaulipas since 19 November 2022. On 26 October 2022, the Congress of Tamaulipas passed a bill to legalize same-sex marriage in a 23–12 vote. The bill was published in the official state journal on 18 November, and took effect the following day. Tamaulipas was the second-to-last state in Mexico to legalize same-sex marriage.

Legal history

Background
The Mexican Supreme Court ruled on 12 June 2015 that state bans on same-sex marriage are unconstitutional nationwide. The court's ruling is considered a "jurisprudential thesis" and did not invalidate state laws, meaning that same-sex couples denied the right to marry would still have to seek individual amparos in court. The ruling standardized the procedures for judges and courts throughout Mexico to approve all applications for same-sex marriages and made the approval mandatory. Specifically, the court ruled that same-sex marriage bans violate Articles 1 and 4 of the Constitution of Mexico. Article 1 of the Constitution states that "any form of discrimination, based on ethnic or national origin, gender, age, disabilities, social status, medical conditions, religion, opinions, sexual orientation, marital status, or any other form, which violates the human dignity or seeks to annul or diminish the rights and freedoms of the people, is prohibited.", and Article 4 relates to matrimonial equality, stating that "man and woman are equal under the law. The law shall protect the organization and development of the family."

On 26 June 2014, 57 people filed an amparo challenging the constitutionality of the same-sex marriage ban. They were granted the right to marry on 1 October 2014 by federal judges in both the Third District Court based in Nuevo Laredo and the Ninth District Court based in Tampico. This was the first time that an amparo had been sought for individuals rather than couples; should any of the single parties wish to marry, their partners would be covered. The state appealed the decision to the Supreme Court, which ruled on 22 February 2017 that the definition of marriage in the Civil Code of Tamaulipas was unconstitutional. The court granted the 57 individuals the right to marry their same-sex partner. A further 68 people requested a collective amparo in Tampico, and received approval on 26 March 2015.

On 23 May 2016, an amparo was granted to two women who sought the right to marry. In November 2016, a federal judge granted another amparo to a same-sex couple. The judge declared article 43 of the Regulatory Law of the Civil Registry and article 124 of the Civil Code unconstitutional, stating that it was obligatory that those two articles be altered to provide for same-sex marriages. In January 2017, a federal judge threatened deputies of the Congress of Tamaulipas with 100-day fines should they continue to refuse to legalize same-sex marriage. By November 2018, 19 same-sex couples had married in Tamaulipas via the recurso de amparo remedy.

By statute, in Mexico, if any five rulings from the courts on a single issue result in the same outcome, legislatures are bound to change the law. In the case of Tamaulipas, three collective amparos and 17 individual amparos for same-sex marriage rights had been approved by September 2018. LGBT advocates filed proceedings with the Supreme Court in September 2018, arguing that the ban should be declared void and unenforceable. On 16 November 2018, the court declared the ban unconstitutional and ordered Congress to modify the Civil Code within 180 business days to provide for same-sex marriages. However, legislators refuse to modify the law. A deputy was planning on filing a lawsuit with the Supreme Court in 2022 in hopes of forcing the state to comply with the earlier ruling. By October 2022, 140 amparos for same-sex marriage rights had been granted in Tamaulipas, the largest number of any state.

Legislative action
In 2011, LGBT activists pushed the Congress of Tamaulipas to pass a bill legalizing same-sex civil unions. In 2012, activists presented legislators with 25,000 signatures in favor of same-sex marriage. In 2013, the Party of the Democratic Revolution agreed to support the proposal and bring the issue to a vote in Congress. However, no vote took place over the following years, and the proposal was placed in the "legislative freezer" (congelador legislativo). In June 2015, Deputy Olga Sosa Ruiz confirmed that Congress was working on a bill to legalize same-sex marriage. She stated that the reform was complex and predicted that the law would be passed within the next legislative session, though no bill passed for the following seven years.

Passage of legislation in 2022
A bill to legalize same-sex marriage was introduced to Congress by Deputy Nancy Ruíz Martínez from the conservative National Action Party (PAN) in early October 2022. It was passed by a Congress committee on 19 October 2022 in a 14–1 vote. A final vote was scheduled for the following week. The bill was approved by Congress by 23 votes to 12 with one abstention on 26 October, with those voting in favor being members of the National Regeneration Movement, the Institutional Revolutionary Party, Citizens' Movement and some PAN deputies. Religious groups opposed to same-sex marriage disrupted the session, causing legislators to move to another venue to vote on the legislation. The bill was published in the official state journal on 18 November, following Governor Américo Villarreal Anaya's signature, and took effect the following day.

The law ensures that married same-sex couples enjoy the same rights, benefits and responsibilities as married opposite-sex couples, including tax benefits, immigration rights, property rights, inheritance, etc. Adoption by same-sex couples had already been legal prior to 2022, and so the legislation did not address this issue further. The first same-sex marriage performed under the legislation took place in Tampico on 22 November between Carlos Rojas Hernández and Alejandro Tenorio del Angel.

Marriage statistics
The first same-sex marriage in Altamira was performed in December 2017, and the first in Ciudad Madero took place in February 2018.

Public opinion
According to a 2018 survey by the National Institute of Statistics and Geography, 44% of the Tamaulipas public opposed same-sex marriage.

See also
 Same-sex marriage in Mexico
 LGBT rights in Mexico

References

External links
 Text of Tamaulipas' same-sex marriage law (in Spanish)

Tamaulipas
Tamaulipas
2022 in LGBT history